Tatiana Potîng (born 4 February 1971) is a Moldovan politician who served as deputy prime minister between 31 May 2013 and 18 February 2015.

Early life and education
Potîng was born in a village Hîjdieni, Glodeni District, on 4 February 1971. In 1993 she received a bachelor's degree in philology from  Alecu Russo State University of Bălți. In 2007 she graduated from Institute of Philology of the Academy of Sciences and obtained a PhD.

Career
Potîng started her career as a teacher in 1993. Then she worked at Alecu Russo State University of Bălți from 1998 to 2009. She was appointed vice minister of education in 2009. On 31 May 2013 she was named as the deputy prime minister for social affairs in the cabinet led by Prime Minister Iurie Leancă. Her term ended on 18 February 2015. She is part of Liberal Reformer Party.

References

1971 births
Government ministers of Moldova
Living people
Academic staff of the Alecu Russo State University of Bălți
Moldovan philologists
People from Glodeni District
Women philologists
21st-century Moldovan women politicians